Ben Ellis (11 April 1906 – 1 January 1968) was a Welsh footballer who played for Bargoed Town, Tredegar, Bangor and Motherwell, as a left back. He also represented Wales and the Scottish League, and was selected for a Scottish Football Association tour of North America in 1939, official eligibility rules not applying.

Ellis signed for Motherwell in 1930 and made 286 Scottish Football League appearances for the club, also appearing in two Scottish Cup finals in 1933 and 1939, both ending in defeat.

An injury sustained while he was working in a local engineering business effectively ended his playing career, but Ellis then worked as a trainer and a coach for Motherwell. He finally left the club in 1955. Away from football, in 1941 he won the Scottish Professional Championship of snooker. In 1990, a street near Fir Park, the home ground of Motherwell, was named after Ellis.

References

External links 

1906 births
1968 deaths
People from Bargoed
Sportspeople from Caerphilly County Borough
Welsh footballers
Wales international footballers
Association football fullbacks
Scottish Football League players
Scottish Football League representative players
Motherwell F.C. players
Motherwell F.C. non-playing staff
Bangor City F.C. players
Welsh snooker players